Crayola Treasure Adventure  is a video game based on the Crayola company line of crayons developed by Firebrand Games and published by Crave Entertainment for the Nintendo DS. The player is a person lost on an island searching for treasure, with only a map and crayons.

Gameplay
The game plays as a virtual colouring book. The game contains 100 colouring book pages and 120 of Crayola's signature shades, which match up to their real-life equivalents. Different settings let the player apply colour either in the patchy style of a real crayon, or in a more smooth texture. The title has unlockable areas and pictures.

Development
A partnership between Crave Entertainment and Crayola to being Crayola themed video games into the market was announced on March 14, 2007. The game premiered at the 2007 E3. The title was due to be released onto store shelves in September of that year, but this was postponed to October.

Reception
Jeux Video felt the game's flaws would push aspiring artists to seek real-life colouring books instead. Den Of Geek felt it was an "excellent puzzle and colouring game for younger children". Pocket Gamer UK felt the title was much better as a virtual colouring book than as a game. Eurogamer disliked the tiny amount of adventure game content.

References

External links
 Crayola Treasure Adventures at Gamespot

2007 video games
Crayola
Nintendo DS games
Nintendo DS-only games
Video games based on works
Video games developed in the United States
Firebrand Games games
Single-player video games
Crave Entertainment games